The Lake of the Hills Community Club is a historic site in Lake Wales, Florida, United States. It is located at 47 East Starr Avenue. On March 24, 2000, it was added to the National Register of Historic Places.In 1914 a plot of land (approx 2 acres) was set aside by an early land developer in Polk county by the name of W.J.Howey who through his land company purchased several hundreds of acres around Starr Lake and beyond, which he plotted and platted for home-site development. The Railroad was well established and utilized by many wealth patrons who established a winter community known as Mountain Lake estates Upon Which world famous Bok Tower carillon was built. He visualised that many wealthy Northerners would likewise purchase his platted acreage (most were platted as 6 acre sites ). He was mindful that this community would need common acreage for recreational community site. Located on the North-Westernmost corner of Starr lake the "Club" was officially designated in 1904 and in 1927 the Club House was constructed by the local residents using their talents and money. Coincidentally, the construction and dedication coincided that of Bok Tower and Gardens which was presided over by then President Calvin Coolidge. Originally the Club was for the use of only owners of a Howey land plot but as a precursor to National Registration participation and member ship was thrown open to the general public. Over 400 persons,including most local dignitaries and public officials, attended the "100th Centennial Celebration" held in 2014 where the name of the "Club" was changed to Lake Of The Hills Community Center.

References

External links
 Polk County listings at National Register of Historic Places
 Lake of the Hills Community Club at Florida's Office of Cultural and Historical Programs

Buildings and structures in Lake Wales, Florida
National Register of Historic Places in Polk County, Florida